Luka Turk (born September 9, 1986) is a Slovenian swimmer who specialized in freestyle events. He has set numerous national records for the freestyle events (200 m, 400 m, and 1500 m), including two at the 2007 Slovenian Open Championships. Turk was scheduled to compete for the men's 400 m freestyle at the 2008 Summer Olympics in Beijing, but withdrew from the games because of a knee injury.

References

External links
NBC 2008 Olympics profile

Living people
Slovenian male freestyle swimmers
People from Radovljica
1986 births